Cychrus tuberculatus is a species of ground beetle in the subfamily Carabinae. It was described by Thaddeus William Harris in 1839.

References

tuberculatus
Beetles described in 1839